Ferdinand of León may refer to:
Ferdinand I of León and Castile (died 1056), king
Ferdinand II of León (died 1188), king
Ferdinand of León (died 1214), infante

See also
Ferdinand of Castile (disambiguation)